Muñana is a municipality located in the province of Ávila, Castile and León, Spain. According to the 2006 census (INE), the municipality has a population of 543 inhabitants. Total area is 33 km² and population is 394 as of 2018.

References 

Municipalities in the Province of Ávila